Statistics of Swedish football Division 3 for the 1961 season.

League standings

Norra Norrland 1961

Mellersta Norrland 1961

Södra Norrland 1961

Norra Svealand 1961

Östra Svealand 1961

Västra Svealand 1961

Nordöstra Götaland 1961

Nordvästra Götaland 1961

Mellersta Götaland 1961

Sydöstra Götaland 1961

Sydvästra Götaland 1961

Södra Götaland 1961

Footnotes

References 

Swedish Football Division 3 seasons
3
Swed
Swed